The Kazakhstan Open was a men's professional golf tournament on the Challenge Tour, the official developmental tour of the European Tour. First played in 2005, it was held at the Nurtau Golf Club in Almaty, Kazakhstan for the first four editions before moving to the Zhailjau Golf Resort, also in Almaty. Between 2010 and 2018 it had alternated between Nurtau and Zhailjau.

History
Since 2014 the Kazakhstan Open had a prize fund of €450,000, making it one of the richest events on the tour at the time.

In 2012 Scott Henry beat HP Bacher at the second hole of a sudden-death playoff. Henry had holed a 25-foot putt at the final hole to force the playoff and won when Bacher failed to get a par at the second extra hole.

In 2017 Tapio Pulkkanen beat Chase Koepka at the third playoff hole after Koepka took a bogey 5.

Winners

References

External links
Coverage on the Challenge Tour's official site

Former Challenge Tour events
Golf tournaments in Kazakhstan
Recurring sporting events established in 2005
Autumn events in Kazakhstan